Tangia Zaman Methila (born 31 January 1984;) is a Bangladeshi Model, television host, Bollywood film actress, and beauty pageant titleholder who was crowned Miss Universe Bangladesh 2020. In a Bollywood film named Rohingya where she taking part as the main actress.

Awards
BIFA Awards 2023 
Best International Female Model, Paris Fashion Week 2022
 Miss Universe Bangladesh, 2020

Pageantry

Face of Bangladesh 2019 and Face of Asia 2019
Methila was a contestant of Face of Asia 2019 in South Korea's capital Seoul where she represented Bangladesh. At the end of the pageant, Ayu Maulida of Indonesia crowned as the winner of Face of Asia 2019, which then Methila also competed against her once again in the Miss Universe 2020 contest.

Miss Supranational 2019
Methila was crowned Miss Supranational Bangladesh 2019. She had the right to represent Bangladesh in Miss Supranational 2019, but she decided to withdraw from the competition.

Miss Universe Bangladesh 2020 and Miss Universe 2020
On 5 April 2020, Miss Universe Bangladesh 2020 was held in Radisson Blu Dhaka Water Garden and sponsored by Flora Bank. At the end of the event, Methila chosen as the winner of Miss Universe Bangladesh 2020, which gain the rights to represent Bangladesh in Miss Universe 2020 that will be held on 16 May 2021 but later announced that she can't compete due to travel restrictions.

Filmography

Films
 Rohingya - People from nowhere (2021)

References

Tangia Zaman Methila will not participate in the 69th Miss Universe.

External links
 
 
 

Living people
1994 births
People from Dhaka
Bangladeshi female models
Miss Universe Bangladesh winners
Bangladeshi actresses
Bangladeshi film actresses
Actresses in Hindi cinema
Bangladeshi expatriate actresses in India
21st-century Bangladeshi actresses
University of Liberal Arts Bangladesh alumni